Ouichka Mosque, is a Tunisian mosque located in the north of the medina of Tunis.
It does not exist anymore.

Localization
The mosque was located in Ibn Abi Dhiaf Street.

Etymology
Ouichka is a Spanish word that refers to a Tunisian family with Andalusian origins.

History
It was built after the arrival of the Andalusians.

References 

Mosques in Tunis